Tijuana No! is a Mexican ska, rock and punk band from Tijuana, Baja California, México. The band is considered a punk rock, ska band in Mexico and influenced by The Clash, Dead Kennedys, Sex Pistols and Black Flag.  In the beginning their name was Radio Chantaje (Blackmail Radio), and later they became No, but upon the knowledge of another band called the same, they changed their name to No de Tijuana (Not From Tijuana), to later just shorten it to Tijuana No!. They were characterized by the social criticism in their lyrics, where they also showed their support to the EZLN, and made reference in their songs to racial, cultural, international, and governmental problems, like the immigration policies in the United States. In 1991 they recorded their first album under an independent label, and one year later (1992) they released the same album (with some design changes) under Culebra Records (BMG), who gave them international recognition promoting the single Pobre de Ti (Poor You).

In its early stages they had the participation of Mexican singer Julieta Venegas, who left  the band and started a solo career. Luis Güereña, one of the three singers the group died in 2004 due to a heart attack while he was watching television at his home in Tijuana.  He was discovered by one of his best friends, Paul Thomas, of No Cover Magazine.  Thomas tried to revive Güereña to no avail.

The group officially disbanded in December 2002, although they have met occasionally to pay tribute to their companion Luis Güereña.

Members
 Luis Güereña - Percussion & vocals (Deceased)
 Cecilia Bastida - Keyboards, Vocals
 Teca García - Percussion, vocals & flutes
 Jorge Velázquez - Bass & backing vocals
 Jorge Jiménez - Guitar
 Alejandro Zúñiga - Drums
 Dardin Coria - Keyboards
 Edmundo Arroyo-Saxofon
 Julieta Venegas - Vocals, acoustic guitar, accordion, and keyboard

Discography
 Indefinicion 1990 Demo cassette 
NO - 1991 (Rock and Roll Circus (Independent Label))
NO - 1992 (Culebra)(BMG). With the participation of Rocco and Sax (Maldita Vecindad), Dennis Parker (Haragan y Compania) and Manu Chao.
Transgresores de la Ley - 1994  (Culebra)(BMG). With the participation of Manu Chao, Fermin Muguruza and Todos Tus Muertos.
Contra Revolución Avenue - 1998  (BMG Latin). With the participation of Kid Frost.
Rock del Milenio - 1999  (BMG Latin) 
Live at Bilbao, Spain - 2000   (BMG Latin)
Lo Mejor de Tijuana NO! - 2001   (BMG Latin)

Rock en Español music groups
Mexican ska groups
Musical groups from Tijuana
Anarcho-punk groups
Musical groups established in 1992
Musical groups disestablished in 2002